The 1953 Missouri Tigers football team was an American football team that represented the University of Missouri in the Big Seven Conference (Big 7) during the 1953 college football season. The team compiled a 6–4 record (4–2 against Big 7 opponents), finished in a tie for second place in the Big 7, and outscored its opponents by a combined total of 130 to 116. Don Faurot was the head coach for the 16th of 19 seasons. The team played its home games at Memorial Stadium in Columbia, Missouri.

The team's statistical leaders included Robert Bauman with 405 rushing yards, Vic Eaton with 364 passing yards and 683 yards of total offense, Elmer Corpeny with 179 receiving yards, and Bob Schoonmaker with 36 points scored.

Schedule

References

Missouri
Missouri Tigers football seasons
Missouri Tigers football